Frank Searle may refer to:

 Frank Searle (photographer) (1921–2005), British photographer of the Loch Ness Monster
 Frank Searle (businessman) (1874–1948), chief engineer of the London General Omnibus Company and managing director of Imperial Airways
 Frank Searle (footballer) (1906–1977), English footballer

See also
Francis Searle, English film director, writer and producer